"Lies to Me" is the second single by Canadian rock group 54-40 from the band's seventh studio album, Trusted by Millions.

Charts

References

External links

1996 singles
54-40 songs
1995 songs